Ideopsis oberthurii is a species of nymphalid butterfly in the Danainae subfamily. It is endemic to Indonesia.

References

Ideopsis
Butterflies of Indonesia
Endemic fauna of Indonesia
Butterflies described in 1891
Taxonomy articles created by Polbot